Gleinkersee is a mountain lake in Upper Austria located in the municipality of Spital am Pyhrn, north of the Totes Gebirge.

Geography 
There is a large car park at the Seebauer at the end of the street.

The water volume is 1.59 million cubic meters. The banks are rocky and steeply sloping, only in the northern part, near the ship huts, is there a narrow strip of muddy ground in front of the shallow bank formed by meadows. The banks are surmounted by the Seespitz ( above sea level) in the southeast and by the east walls of the Präwald ( above sea level) in the southwest.

Geology 
During the ice ages, a glacier flowing from the cirques on the north slope of the Dead Mountains formed the lake basin. Below the steep rock faces, which are made up of solid Dachstein limestone, there is soft marl (flysch rock) that was easily excavated by the ice. The terminal moraine is now in the area of the Gasthof Seebauer. This is unlocked at the intersection of the parking lot. After the lake was formed in this way, the deep, funnel-shaped collapse in the cave-rich Dachstein limestone took place. If the funnel had formed at the time of the glaciation, it would have been filled with debris from the ground moraine in a short time.

History 
During the Middle Ages, the lake was property of the Gleink Abbey. Due to the distance from the Abbey to the lake, it was temporarily let out to the Spital am Pyhrn Abbey in 1589 for the price of 200 guilder. In 1608 it was permanently ceded for another payment of 200 guilder.

References 

Lakes of Upper Austria
LGleinkersee